Donald Piper may refer to:
 Donald Piper (basketball)
 Donald Piper (murderer)